Arundhati Pantawane (born 2 September 1989) is an Indian female badminton singles player. She represented India at the women's team event of the 2010 Asian Games. Among other achievements, she won gold medal at the 2011 National Games along with finishing runner-up at the 75th Senior National Badminton Championships.

Career titles

Individual titles (1)

 International Challenge

Individual runners-up (2)

 International Challenge
 International Series

Family
In 2016 January, Arundhati married Kozhikode native badminton player Arun Vishnu.

References

External links
 

1989 births
Living people
Indian female badminton players
Badminton players at the 2010 Asian Games
Sportspeople from Nagpur
Sportswomen from Maharashtra
21st-century Indian women
21st-century Indian people
Racket sportspeople from Maharashtra
Asian Games competitors for India
20th-century Indian women